Port is a small rural community in Washita County, Oklahoma, United States. The community had a post office from February 21, 1901, until February 29, 1940. It was named for a druggist, Mrs. F. M. Port. During the 1930s, the Port consolidated school district covered the largest area in Oklahoma, some ninety square miles.

Prior to settlement, the Western Cattle Trail passed just east of the site.

The community lends its name to the Oklahoma state soil, Port Silt Loam.

See also
Port Silt Loam

External links
Port, Oklahoma – RootsWeb.com

Unincorporated communities in Washita County, Oklahoma
Unincorporated communities in Oklahoma